The 17th Annual Latin Grammy Awards were held on November 17, 2016 at the T-Mobile Arena in Paradise, Nevada.

The nominations were announced on September 21, 2016. Julio Reyes Copello, Djavan, Fonseca, Jesse & Joy, and Ricardo López Lalinde leads with four nominations each. American singer Marc Anthony was honored as the Latin Recording Academy Person of the Year on November 16, the day prior to the Latin Grammy Awards.

Performers

Awards
The following is the list of nominees. Winners are listed first and in bold.

General
Record of the Year
Carlos Vives and Shakira — "La Bicicleta"
 Pepe Aguilar — "Cuestión de Esperar"
 Pablo Alborán — "Se Puede Amar"
 Andrea Bocelli — "Me Faltarás"
 Buika — "Si Volveré"
 Djavan — "Vidas Pra Contar"
 Enrique Iglesias featuring Wisin — "Duele el Corazón"
 Jesse & Joy — "Ecos de Amor"
 Laura Pausini — "Lado Derecho del Corazón"
 Diego Torres — "Iguales"

Album of the Year
Juan Gabriel —  Los Dúo 2
 Pablo Alborán — Tour Terral: Tres Noches en Las Ventas
 Andrea Bocelli — Cinema (Edición en Español)
 Andrés Cepeda — Mil Ciudades
 Djavan — Vidas Pra Contar
 Fonseca — Conexión
 Jesse & Joy — Un Besito Más
 José Lugo & Guasábara Combo — ¿Donde Están?
 Diego Torres — Buena Vida
 Julieta Venegas — Algo Sucede

Song of the Year
Andrés Castro, Shakira and Carlos Vives — "La Bicicleta" (Carlos Vives and Shakira)
 Patty Brayden, Ned Claflin and John Finbury — "A Chama Verde" (John Finbury featuring Marcella Camargo)
 Flavio Cianciarulo — "La Tormenta" (Los Fabulosos Cadillacs)
 Fonseca — "Céu"
 Enrique Iglesias, Patrick A. Ingunza, Silverlo Lozada, Servando Moriche Primera Mussett, Hasibur Rahman, Francisco Saldana and Wisin — "Duele el Corazón" (Enrique Iglesias featuring Wisin)
 Manuel Medrano — "Bajo el Agua"
 Paulinho Moska and Fito Páez — "Hermanos" 
 Jesse & Joy, Danelle Leverett, Jason Reeves and Rune Westberg — "Ecos de Amor" (Jesse & Joy)
 Kevin Johansen — "Es Como El Día"
 Sin Bandera — "En Ésta No"

Best New Artist
Manuel Medrano
 Sophia Abrahão
 Álex Anwandter
 The Chamanas
 Esteman
 Joss Favela
 ILE
 Mon Laferte
 Morat
 Ian Ramil

Pop
Best Contemporary Pop Vocal Album
Jesse & Joy — Un Besito Más
 Pablo Alborán — Tour Terral
 Pablo López — El Mundo y los Amantes Inocentes
 Luciano Pereyra — #TuMano
 Reik — Des/Amor

Best Traditional Pop Vocal Album
Juan Gabriel — Los Dúo, Vol. 2
 Adrián — Lleno de Vida
 Andrea Bocelli — Cinema
 Andrés Cepeda — Mil Ciudades
 Diego Torres — Buena Vida

Urban
Best Urban Fusion/Performance
Yandel — "Encantadora"
 Alexis & Fido — "Una En Un Millón"
 El Dusty featuring Happy Colors — "Cumbia Anthem"
 Jacob Forever — "Hasta Que Se Seque El Malecon"
 Tubarao featuring Maneirinho and Anitta — "Pra Todas Elas"

Best Urban Music Album
J Balvin — Energia
 El B — Luz
 Emicida — Sobre Crianças, Quadris, Pesadelos e Lições de Casa...
 Farruko — Visionary
 Arianna Puello — Despierta

Best Urban Song
Egbert Rosa Cintrón, Farruko, Eduardo A. Vargas Berrios and Yandel — "Encantadora" (Yandel)
 Miguel Correa, Cosculluela, Daddy Yankee, José Gómez, Roberto Martínez Lebrón, Jorge Oquendo and Orlando Javier Valle Vega — "A Donde Voy" (Cosculluela featuring Daddy Yankee)
 De La Ghetto — "Acércate"
 Juan Alonzo V. Angulo, Francisco Espinoza, David Rolas, Sito Rocks and Rafael Vargas — "12 Rosas" (David Rolas featuring Fulanito and Sito Rocks)
 Arianna Puello — "Hardcore y Feroz"

Rock
Best Rock Album
Los Fabulosos Cadillacs — La Salvación de Solo Y Juan
 Andrea Álvarez — Y Lo Dejamos Venir
 Marilina Bertoldi — Sexo Con Modelos
 Massacre — Biblia Ovni
 Spinetta — Los Amigo

Best Pop/Rock Album
Julieta Venegas — Algo Sucede
 Caramelos de Cianuro — 8
 Jotdog — Universos Paralelos
 La Santa Cecilia — Buenaventura
 Meteoros — Meteoros

Best Rock Song
Flavio Cianciarulo — "La Tormenta" (Los Fabulosos Cadillacs)
 Asier Cazalis — "Abismo" (Caramelos de Cianuro)
 Gustavo Cordera — "Fantasma Soy"
 Luisina Bertoldi, Brenda Martín and Gabriel Pedernera — "Nada Salvaje" (Eruca Sativa)
 Massacre — "Niña Dios"

Alternative
Best Alternative Music Album
Illya Kuryaki and the Valderramas — L.H.O.N.
 Bebe — Cambio de Piel
 Esteman — Caótica Belleza
 Mon Laferte — Mon Laferte - Vol. 1
 Carla Morrison — Amor Supremo

Best Alternative Song
Carla Morrison — "Vez Primera"
 Gustavo Cortés, Ricardo Cortés and Nicolas González — "Ángeles y Serafines" (Sig Ragga)
 Vicentico — "Averno, El Fantasma" (Los Fabulosos Cadillacs)
 Felipe Antunes and Otávio Carvalho — "Deus"  (Vitrola Sintética)
 Kevin Johansen — "Es Como El Día"

Tropical
Best Salsa Album
India  —  Intensamente India Con Canciones de Juan Gabriel
Grupo Niche  —  35 Aniversario
José Lugo and Guasábara Combo — ¿Dónde Están?
Bobby Valentín – Mi Ritmo es Bueno
Johnny Ventura – Tronco Viejo

Best Cumbia/Vallenato Album
Fonseca — Homenaje (A La Música de Diomedes Díaz)
El Gran Martín Elías & Rolando Ochoa— Imparables
Kuisitambó — Desde El Fondo
Felipe Peláez and Manuel Julían — Vestirte De Amor
Various Artists — Mujeres Por Colombia - Vallenato Volúmen 2

Best Contemporary Tropical Album
Guaco — Guaco Histórico 2
Héctor Acosta — Merengue y Sentimiento
David Calzado and Charanga Habanera — Vivito y Coleando
Toño Restrepo — En La Sala con El Joe
Daniel Santacruz — Toda La Vida
Charlie Zaa — Mi Mejor Regalo

Best Traditional Tropical Album
Sonora Santanera — La Sonora Santanera En Su 60 Aniversario
Rafael Pollo Brito — Pa' Tío Simón
Jesús "Chino" Miranda — El Malquerido: Original Motion Picture Soundtrack
Septeto Nacional Ignacio Piñeiro — El Más Grande y Universal
Various Artists — Cuba y Puerto Rico Son...

Best Tropical Fusion Album
Gente de Zona — Visualízate
Cali Flow Latino — Full Hd
Cosa Nuestra — Pregoneros de La Calle
Explosión Negra — Levántate
Treo — Genera

Best Tropical Song
Omar Alfanno, Fonseca, and Yadam González Cárdenas – "Vine A Buscarte" (Fonseca)
Jorge Luis Piloto – "Esta Noche Hay Fiesta" (Maía)
Antonio Ávila – "La Bala" (Johnny Ventura featuring Gilberto Santa Rosa)
Prince Royce and Daniel Santacruz – "La Carretera" (Prince Royce)
Orlando Rodríguez Di Pietro – "No Me Daba Cuenta" (Gabriel C)

Singer-Songwriter
Best Singer-Songwriter Album
Manuel Medrano — Manuel Medrano
 Francisco Céspedes — Todavía
 Djavan — Vidas Pra Contar
 Pedro Guerra — Arde Estocolmo
 Kevin Johansen + The Nada — Mis Américas, Vol. 1/2
 Alejandro Lerner — Auténtico

Regional Mexican
Best Banda Album
Banda El Recodo De Cruz Lizárraga — Raíces
 Julión Álvarez — Mis Ídolos, Hoy Mis Amigos!!!
 Banda Los Recoditos — Me Está Gustando
 Banda Troyana — Tengo Ganas de Ser Fiel
 La Séptima Banda — A Todos Volumen

Best Tejano Album
Michael Salgado — Por Cielo y Tierra
 Ram Herrera — Mucho Mas Que Amor
 The Legends — La Historia de La Musica Tejana
 Marian y Mariel — Vulnerable a Ti
 Jay Perez — Un Amigo Tendrás

Best Norteño Album
Los Tigres del Norte —  Desde El Azteca
 Joss Favela — Hecho a Mano
 Intocable — Highway
 Los Ramones De Nuevo León — Tierra Mojada
 Pesado  — Tributo a Los Alegres De Terán

Best Regional Mexican Song
Erika Ender, Manu Morendo, and Mónica Vèlez — "Ataúd" (Los Tigres del Norte)
 Javier Manriquez — "Amor de Los Pobres" (La Original Banda El Limón De Salvador Lizáarraga)
 Salvador Aponte, Dany Pérez, and César Valdivia — "Me Está Gustando" (Banda Los Recoditos)
 Espinoza Paz — "Te Dirán" (La Addictiva Banda San José de Mesillas)
 Joan Sebastian — "Volví Pa'l Pueblo"

Instrumental
Best Instrumental Album
Hamilton de Holanda — Samba de Chico
Víctor Biglione — Mercosul
João Donato — Donato Elétrico
Carlos Franzetti — Argentum
Bruno Miranda — Mosaico

Traditional
Best Folk Album
Palo Cruza'O — En Armonías Colombianas
Grupo Mapeyé — En Las Islas Canarias
Los Huayra — Gira
Nahuel Pennisi — Primavera
Marco Rodrigues — Fados do Fado

Best Tango Album
Nicolás Ledesma y Su Orquesta — Cuando Llora la Milonga
Ariel Ardit and Filarmónica de Medellín — Gardel Sinfónico
Julio Botti, Pablo Ziegler and Saul Zaks conducting the University of Southern Denmark Symphony Orchestra — Sax to Tango
Omar Mollo — ... Tangamente
Leonardo Pastore — Carlos Gardel Original

Best Flamenco Album
Niña Pastori — Ámame Como Soy
Remedios Amaya — Rompiendo El Silencio
José Mercé — Doy La Cara
Antonio Reyes and Diego Del Morao — Directo En El Círculo Flamenco de Madrid
María Toledo — Magnética

Jazz
Best Latin Jazz Album
Arturo O'Farrill & The Afro Latin Jazz Orchestra — Cuba: The Conversation Continues
Mario Adnet — Jobim Jazz (Ao Vivo)
Antonio Adolfo — Tropical Infinito
Raul Agraz — Between Brothers
Carrera Quinta — Big Band

Christian
Best Christian Album (Spanish Language)
Marcos Vidal — 25 Años
Christine D'Clario — Eterno (Live)
Generasion — Ciudad de Luz
Alex Sampedro — Alex Sampedro
Emir Sensini — Deseo tu Gloria

Best Christian Album (Portuguese Language)
Anderson Freire — Deus Não Te Rejeita
Paulo César Baruk — Graça Quase Acústico
Ceremonya — A Vida Num Segundo
Padre Fabio de Melo — Deus No Esconderijo Do Verso
Adelso Freire — Reaprender

Portuguese Language
Best Portuguese Language Contemporary Pop Album
Céu — Tropix
 Tiago Iorc — Troco Likes
 Larissa Luz — Território Conquistado
 Mariza — Mundo
 Thiago Ramil — Leve Embora

Best Portuguese Language Rock Album
Ian Ramil — Derivacivilização
Scalene — Éter
 Boogarins — Manual
 Jay Vaquer — Canções de Exílio
 Versalle — Distante em Algum Lugar

Best Samba/Pagode Album
Martinho da Vila — De Bem Com a Vida
 Eduardo Gudin — Notícias Dum Brasil 4 
 Corina Magalhães — Tem Mineira no Samba 
 Rogê e Arlindo Cruz — Na Veia 
 Various Artists — Sambas Para Mangueira

Best MPB Album
Elza Soares — A Mulher do Fim do Mundo
 Dani Black — Dilúvio 
 Roberta Campos — Todo Caminho é Sorte 
 Celso Fonseca — Like Nice 
 Roberta Sá — Delírio 

Best Brazilian Roots Album
Almir Sater e Renato Teixeira — AR
 Lucy Alves e Clã Brasil — No Forró do Seu Rosil
 Heraldo do Monte — Heraldo do Monte
 Elba Ramalho — Cordas, Gonzaga e Afins
 Alceu Valença — A Luneta e o Tempo (soundtrack)

Best Portuguese Language Song
Djavan — "Vidas Pra Contar"
 Tiago Iorc — "Amei Te Ver"
 Almir Sater, Paulo Simões and Renato Teixeira — "D de Destino" (Almir Sater and Renato Teixeira)
 Dani Black — "Maior" (Dani Black and Milton Nascimento)
 Douglas Germano — "Maria da Vila Matilde" (Elza Soares)

Children's
Best Latin Children's Album
123 Andrés — Arriba Abajo
ClaraLuna — 1,2,3 Llega Navidad
Marta Gómez — Canciones de Sol
Omara Portuondo — Canciones de Cri Cri “El Grillo Cantor”
Various Artists — Canciones y Palabras, Vol. 1
Xuxa — Abc Do Xspb

Classical
Best Classical Album
Cuarteto Latinoamericano and Jaramar — El Hilo Invisible (Cantos Sefaradíes)
Jordi Savall — Biber: Baroque Splendor
Edith Peña — Danzas En Todos Los Tiempos
A Corte Musical — Durón: Lagrimas, Amor. . .
José Serebrier — José Serebrier Conducts Samuel Adler

Best Classical Contemporary Composition
Claudia Montero — "Cuarteto Para Buenos Aires"
Roberto Sierra — "Beyond The Silence Of Sorrow" (Maximiano Valdés conducting the Puerto Rico Symphony Orchestra)
Fernando Otero — "Jardín del Adiós" (Nick Danielson, violinist; Fernando Otero, pianist)
Gustavo Casenave — "Mi Familia" (Gustavo Casenave featuring Nick Danielson and Pedro Giraudo)
Leo Brouwer — "Sonata de Los Viajeros" (Brasil Guitar Duo)

Recording Package
Best Recording Package
Sergio Mora — El Poeta Halley (Love of Lesbian)
Lisa Akerman Stefaneli — Atlas (Baleia)
Goster — Impredecible (Bareto)
Marcus Mota — Relevante (Mario Diníz)
Goster — Umbral(Melnik)

Production
Best Engineered Album
Be Hussey, Gustavo Lenza, Diogo Poças, Rodrigo Sanches, Mike Cresswell and Felipe Tchauer — Tropix (Céu)
Rodrigo Campello, Márcio Gama, Aurélio Kauffmann, Jon Luz, Fernando Nunes and Carlos Freitas — Delírio (Roberta Sá)
Moogie Canazio and Ron McMaster — Like Nice (Celso Fonseca)
Salomé Limón and Caco Refojo — Magnética (María Toledo)
 Daniel Musy and André Dias — Samba de Chico (Hamilton de Holanda)

Producer of the Year
Rafa Arcaute
 Eduardo Cabra
 Moogie Canazio
 Kim Fanlo
 Rafa Sardina

Music video
Best Short Form Music Video
Illya Kuryaki and the Valderramas – "Gallo Negro"
 Álex Anwandter – "Siempre Es Viernes En Mi Corazón"
 Gustavo Casas y Los Que Buscan – "Verte Ya"
 Delafé – "Lo Más Bonito del Mundo"
 El Guincho featuring Mala Rodríguez – "Comix"

Best Long Form Music Video
Alejandro Sanz – Sirope Vivo
 Babasónicos – Desde Adentro - Impuesto De Fe (En Vivo)
 Bebe – 10 Años Con Bebe
 Dvicio – Justo Ahora y Siempre
 Eugenia León, Tania Libertad and Guadalupe Pineda – Primera Fila

Special Merit Awards
The following is a list of special merit awards 
Lifetime Achievement Awards
 Eugenia León
 Ricardo Montaner
 Ednita Nazario
 Piero

Trustees Award
 Carlos Mejía Godoy
 Nelson Motta
 Rafael Solano Sánchez

Changes to award categories
 Due to the low number of entries, the Best Ranchero/Mariachi Album category was not awarded that year.
 The Brazilian field was renamed to Portuguese Language field

References

External links
 Official Site

2016 in Latin music
2016 in Nevada
2016 music awards
2016
November 2016 events in the United States